The Lion and the Horse is a 1952 American Western film directed by Louis King, written by Crane Wilbur, and starring Steve Cochran and Ray Teal.

Production
Parts of the film were shot in Rockville Road, Kanab Canyon, Cave Lakes, Barracks Canyon, and Three Lakes in Utah.

References

External links
 

American Western (genre) films
1952 Western (genre) films
1952 films
Films shot in Utah
1950s English-language films
Films directed by Louis King
1950s American films